XRD may refer to:

 X-ray diffraction, used to study the structure, composition, and physical properties of materials
 Extensible Resource Descriptor, an XML format for discovery of metadata about a web resource
 Guilty Gear Xrd, a fighting video game.